Snow White and the Seven Thieves is a 1949 Italian comedy film directed by Giacomo Gentilomo. It is loosely based on the  novella Il ladro by Anton Germano Rossi.

Cast 

Peppino De Filippo: Peppino Biancaneve
Mischa Auer: Mirko aka Dr. Lebovich 
Silvana Pampanini: Eleonora
Luigi Pavese: commendator Carlo Casertoni
Franca Maresa: Nella Casertoni 
Gino Saltamerenda: Zefirino Dossetti
Laura Carli: Laura 
Giacomo Furia: brigadiere
Isabella Riva: maid
Lidia Martora: robbed woman
Lamberto Picasso: husband of the  robbed woman 
Vittorio Sanipoli: chaser of Mirko 
Luisa Rossi: woman at Tavernetta

References

External links

1949 films
1949 comedy films
Italian comedy films
Films directed by Giacomo Gentilomo
Films set in Rome
Italian black-and-white films
1940s Italian films